Sibylla is a chain of fast food restaurants located throughout Sweden and Finland.
Sibylla is  operated by Atria Sweden. In 1932, Oskar Lithell launched Sweden's first hot dog under the name Sibylla.  Since then, menus with french fries, hamburgers, meatballs, chicken and kebabs  have been developed.

History
1907 — Oskar Lithell started his first factory in Kumla
1930 — Hot Dog production begins
1932 — Sybil sausage launched
1949 — Start of manufacturing grill sausages
1957 — Production moved to Sköllersta, just outside Örebro
1997 — Sibyl chain formed with over 170 franchisees / kitchens
2004 — Sibylla brand appointed as a Superbrand

See also 
 List of hamburger restaurants

References

External links 

 

Fast-food restaurants
Restaurants in Sweden
Fast-food chains of Finland
Restaurants established in 1932
1932 establishments in Sweden